was a town located in Nishi District, Oshima Subprefecture, Hokkaido, Japan.

The town's name literally means bear rock after a prominent rock formation that looks like a bear and cub on its coast.

As of 2004, the town had an estimated population of 3,487 and a density of 15.82 persons per km2. The total area was 220.38 km2.

As many "town" districts, Kumaishi itself is composed of many smaller villages strung out along the coast facing the Sea of Japan. Its industry mainly comprises fishing, notably squid fishing and at night many lights of the squid fishing fleets can be seen far out in the sea. The area is beautifully scenic in many portions and provides some rare untouched Japanese wilderness although some of the coastline has seen Japanese style engineering and been "decorated" with concrete "tetrapods".

History
On October 1, 2005, Kumaishi was merged with the old town of Yakumo (formerly from Yamakoshi District, Oshima Subprefecture) to create the new and expanded town of Yakumo (now in the newly created Futami District, Oshima Subprefecture). Therefore, Kumaishi was transferred from Hiyama Subprefecture to Oshima Subprefecture as a result of financial difficulties.

Climate

References

External links
 Yakumo official website 

Dissolved municipalities of Hokkaido
Yakumo, Hokkaido